"It's Alright" is a song written and recorded by American rock band 311. After "Hey You", it was the second single from the group's ninth studio album, Uplifter. The single was released through Volcano Entertainment to radio stations on June 9, 2009.

Chart performance

References

2009 singles
311 (band) songs
Volcano Entertainment singles
Song recordings produced by Bob Rock
2009 songs
Songs written by Nick Hexum
Songs written by SA Martinez
Songs written by P-Nut